Edd Nye was a Democratic member of the North Carolina General Assembly representing the US state's twenty-second House district, including constituents in Bladen and Sampson counties. An insurance professional from Elizabethtown, North Carolina, Nye is (2003-2004 session) serving in his thirteenth term in the state House, where he holds the position of Permanent Democratic Caucus Chair. Nye is one of the chief budget writers in the North Carolina House. Nye previously served one term in the state Senate.

Recent electoral history

2006

2004

2002

2000

References

External links
Our Campaigns – Representative Edd Nye (NC) profile

|-

|-

|-

|-

Democratic Party members of the North Carolina House of Representatives
Democratic Party North Carolina state senators
Living people
1932 births
21st-century American politicians
People from Chatham County, North Carolina
People from Elizabethtown, North Carolina